Michel Haguenauer (1916-2000), was a male French international table tennis player.

He won a five medals in the team event at the World Table Tennis Championships. In addition he won a bronze medal at the 1939 World Table Tennis Championships in the men's doubles with Raoul Bedoc and in 1954 he won a silver medal at the 1936 World Table Tennis Championships in the men's doubles with the legendary Viktor Barna.

He won 22 French national titles including eight singles events between 1933 and 1950. He famously played in a match against Marin Vasile-Goldberger that lasted 7 hours 35 minutes before the match was stopped.

He was elected "glory of French sport", and his name is engraved at the Stade Pierre de Coubertin (Paris).

See also
 List of table tennis players
 List of World Table Tennis Championships medalists

References

French male table tennis players
1916 births
2000 deaths
World Table Tennis Championships medalists
20th-century French people